Heterotheca viscida, called the cliff goldenaster, is a North American species of flowering plant in the family Asteraceae. It grows on cliffs and ledges in mountainous regions. It grows in the southwestern United States, primarily in Arizona, New Mexico and southern Texas with reports of isolated populations in Nevada, southeastern Idaho, and southeastern Colorado.

References

External links
Photo of herbarium specimen at Missouri Botanical Garden, collected in Arizona in 1881, isotype of Chrysopsis villosa var. viscida/Heterotheca viscida

viscida
Flora of the Southwestern United States
Plants described in 1884